Clemente Yerovi Indaburu (10 August 1904 – 19 July 1981) was a politician and the interim president of Ecuador from 30 March 1966, to 16 November 1966.

Yerovi was born in Barcelona, Spain, where his parents Clemente Yerovi Matheus and María Indaburu Seminario lived temporarily as consul general of Ecuador.  Yerovi studied at Vicente Rocafuerte High School in Guayaquil, and then at San Gabriel High School in Quito.  He married Victoria Gómez Ycaza and had four children, who were named:

 María Laura Yerovi Gómez
 Elena Yerovi Gómez
 Clemente Yerovi Gómez
 Fernando Yerovi Gómez

He had many links to agriculture on the coast of the country, where he acquired a farm, that split in parts among its workers. Yerovi tenure is remembered by most Ecuadorians as a time of peace and prosperity. Even though Yerovi was not elected by popular vote, Ecuadorians are very fond of his persona, erecting many monuments and naming avenues with his name.

In 1948 he was economy minister of Galo Plaza's government, and then senator for agriculture.

Yerovi died in Guayaquil, Ecuador.

References

1904 births
1981 deaths
Presidents of Ecuador
Ambassadors of Ecuador to the Holy See
Ecuadorian people of Spanish descent
Government ministers of Ecuador
Politicians from Barcelona